The Southern Education Foundation (SEF) is a not-for-profit foundation created in 1937 from four different funds — the Peabody Education Fund, the John F. Slater Fund, the Negro Rural School Fund, and the Virginia Randolph Fund. Their main goal is to promote quality education for traditionally disadvantaged students, including the poor and African Americans. SEF provides research, policy analysis and programming in Alabama, Arkansas, Florida, Georgia, Kentucky, Louisiana, Maryland, Mississippi, North Carolina, Oklahoma, South Carolina, Tennessee, Texas, Virginia, and West Virginia. Raymond C. Pierce is the current president.

The phrase "Southern Education Foundation: Since 1867" refers to the Foundation's evolution from the Peabody Education Fund. Founded of necessity due to damage caused largely by the American Civil War, the Peabody Education Fund was established by George Peabody in 1867 for the purpose of promoting "intellectual, moral, and industrial education in the most destitute portion of the Southern States."

References

External links

Southern United States
1937 establishments in the United States
Educational foundations in the United States